Beng Chin Ooi is a Singaporean computer scientist, currently a Distinguished Professor at National University of Singapore and also the Chang Jiang Professor at Zhejiang University. He is a Fellow of the Institute of Electrical and Electronics Engineers, Association for Computing Machinery and Singapore National Academy of Science. He did his BSc (1985) and PhD (1989) at Monash University.

References

External links

Year of birth missing (living people)
Living people
Academic staff of the National University of Singapore
Singaporean computer scientists
Monash University alumni
Fellow Members of the IEEE